Yaiko's Selection is an album by Japanese singer and songwriter Hitomi Yaida. It is a collection of tracks personally selected by the singer as her favourite. Originally released as part of the Single Collection/Yaiko's Selection Box Set, it was issued on its own following fan demands. Released in 2004, it peaked at No. 30 on the Japanese albums charts.

Track listing

References

Hitomi Yaida albums
2004 compilation albums